Uwe Ommer (born 1943 in Bergisch Gladbach) is a German photographer.

Published works 
 Photedition 2. Verlag Photographie, Schaffhausen 1980, .
 Exotic. Bahia Verlag, München 1983, .
 Pirelli Calendar. 1984.
 Black ladies. Taco, Berlin 1987, .
 Erotic Photographs. Taco, Berlin 1988, .
 Uwe Ommer. Benedikt Taschen Verlag, Berlin 1990, .
 Noumia. Vents d'Ouest, Issy-les-Moulineaux 1994, .
 Black ladies. Taschen, Cologne 1995, .
 Asian ladies. Taschen, Cologne 2000, .
 1000 Families: das Familienalbum des Planeten Erde. Taschen, Cologne 2002, .
 Transit : in 1424 Tagen um die Welt. Taschen, Cologne 2006, .
 Do It Yourself, with Renaud Marchand. Taschen, Cologne 2007, .

Bibliography 
Reinhold Mißelbeck (editor): Prestel-Lexikon der Fotografen : von den Anfängen 1839 bis zur Gegenwart. Prestel, Munich 2002, .

References

External links 
 
 Uwe Ommer Photography

1943 births
People from Bergisch Gladbach
Photographers from North Rhine-Westphalia
Fashion photographers
Documentary photographers
Travel photographers
Living people